Cira-Aram Lo (born 22 November 1996) is a Franco-Senegalese handball player for Rouen Handball and the Senegalese national team. During her professional career she played for Nantes Loire Atlantique HB, Noisy le Grand HB, AS Cannes Mandelieu and Rouen Handball.

She competed at the 2019 World Women's Handball Championship in Japan.

References

External links

1996 births
Living people
Senegalese female handball players
People from Lagny-sur-Marne
Sportspeople from Seine-et-Marne
French female handball players
Black French sportspeople
French sportspeople of Senegalese descent